Meier may refer to:

People 

 Meier, Annemarie Sylvia, German chess master
 Meier, Armin, Swiss cyclist
 Meier, Armin (actor), German actor
 Meier, Barbara, German model, most known for winning the third cycle of Germany's Next Topmodel
 Meier, Bernd, German football goalkeeper
 Meier, Bertram (born 1960), German Roman-Catholic bishop
 Meier, Billy, UFO contactee
 Meier, Carl A., Swiss psychiatrist and Jungian Psychologist
 Meier, Karl, Swiss chef
 Meier, Carson (born 1995), American football player
 Meier, Christian, several people of this name
 Meier, Dieter, a Swiss-Indian musician
 Meier, Deborah, founder of the modern small schools movement
 Meier, Dutch, American baseball player
 Meière, Hildreth (1892–1961), American artist
 Meier, John, German philologist and ethnographer
 Meier, John, Australian politician
 Meier, John H. former business associate of Howard Hughes, involved in Watergate
 Meier, John P., Catholic priest and Bible historian
 Meier, Julius L., businessman and Governor of Oregon
 Meier, Katja, justice minister of Saxony
 Meier, Kenneth J., American professor of political science
 Meier, Paul, medical statistician
 Ronald Meier, American professor of technology management 
 Meier, Megan, notable teenage victim of cyberbullying
 Meier, Myka, American-British etiquette writer
 Meier, Naomi, All-American Girls Professional Baseball League player
 Meier, Richard, American architect
 Meier, Richard L., American urban theorist
 Meier, Rob, American football defensive tackle/defensive end for the Jacksonville Jaguars
 Meier, Rudolf, Swiss Olympic boxer
 Meier, Sarah, Swiss figure skater
 Meier, Sid, computer game programmer and designer
 Meier, Silvio (1965–1992), East German activist killed by neo-Nazis
 Meier, Timo, Swiss ice hockey player
 Meier, Urs, retired Swiss football referee
 Meier, Waltraud, German mezzo soprano
 Meier, Wes, American football coach

Places 
 Meiers Corners, a neighborhood in Staten Island, New York City, New York, United States
 Méier, a neighbourhood in Rio de Janeiro, Brazil

Other uses 
 A historical kind of bailiff in parts of the Low Countries
 Sid Meier's Alien Crossfire, a computer game
 Sid Meier's Alpha Centauri, a computer game
 Sid Meier's Gettysburg, a computer game
 Sid Meier's Pirates!, a computer game
 Sid Meier's SimGolf, a computer game
 Meier & Frank, a former department store chain
 Meier & Frank Building, a historic commercial building associated with Meier & Frank department stores

See also
Meyer (surname)
Mayer (disambiguation)
Mayr
Meyr (disambiguation)
Meyer (disambiguation)
Meir
Myers
Lemaire
German family name etymology

German-language surnames
Jewish surnames
Yiddish-language surnames
Surnames of Liechtenstein origin
fr:Meier